Sereno Edwards Dwight (May 18, 1786 – November 30, 1850) was an American author, educator, and Congregationalist minister, who served as Chaplain of the Senate.

Early years 

Dwight was the fifth son of Yale College President Timothy Dwight IV and his wife Mary Woolsey, born in Greenfield Hill in Fairfield, Connecticut.  He graduated Yale in 1803, was a tutor there in 1806–1810, and successfully practised law in New Haven, Connecticut in 1810–1816. For several years during this time, he worked ten hours each day preparing an exhaustive "Geography".

Ministry 

Licensed to preach in 1816, he served as the Chaplain of the Senate of the United States for one year's term (December 16, 1816 – December 19, 1817).  Dwight was ordained on September 3, 1817, at Park Street Church, Boston.

Thereafter, he served as pastor of the Park Street Church, Boston, in 1817–1826, where he greatly influenced the young hymn writer and clergyman Ray Palmer (1808–1887), author of "My Faith Looks Up to Thee", among others.  In 1833–1835 he was president of Hamilton College, Clinton, New York. His career was wrecked by accidental mercury poisoning, which interfered with his work in Boston and at Hamilton College, and made his life after 1839 solitary and comparatively uninfluential.

His publications include Life of David Brainerd (1822); Life and Works of Jonathan Edwards (ten volumes, 1830), of whom he was a great-grandson; The Hebrew Wife (1836), an argument against marriage with a deceased wife's sister; and Select Discourses (1851); to which was prefixed a biographical sketch by his brother William Dwight (1795–1865), who was also successively a lawyer and a Congregational preacher.

Personal life 

In August 1811, Dwight married Susan Edwards Daggett (1788 - 1839), the daughter of David Daggett, of New Haven, Connecticut.  Their only daughter did not survive infancy.

Publications 
 William Theodore Dwight, Select Discourses' (1851)

References 

Connecticut lawyers
Yale University alumni
1786 births
1850 deaths
Chaplains of the United States Senate
Writers from Fairfield, Connecticut
Woolsey family